The Menasha Territorial Brigade (also known as the Jenin Brigade) is a Territorial Brigade in the Israel Defense Forces whose role is to control law and order in the Jenin and Tulkarm sectors and to prevent terrorist attacks. The brigade is under the command of the Judea and Samaria Division.

The name and emblem 
The brigade is named after the tribe of Menashe which according to the bible was settled in the same area as the brigade.

The Brigade's emblem is built out of 4 pieces: Blue and white lines, symbolizing the flag of Israel, the Gilboa mountain, A wall that symbolizes the West Bank separation barrier and the lion that represents the Central Command.

Headquarters 
The Headquarters of the unit is located in a military camp near Ein Shemer. Previously it was placed in the Northern West Bank area but was moved because of the Israeli disengagement from Gaza as well as the death of a soldier due to an attack by armed Palestinians in 2004.

Organization and purpose 
Unlike the other territorial divisions in the West Bank, the Menasha Division is not responsible for just one central Palestinian district, but for two: Jenin and Tulkarm.

The sector of the division extends over a large area and is surrounded on its northern and western sides by the separation fence, which separates the areas of the West Bank and Israel. To the south, the sector borders on the Samaria and Ephraim Territorial Brigades, and on the east by the Valley Territorial Brigade.

In addition to the cities, in the sector of the brigade there are hundreds of Palestinian villages, for example Ya'bad and Barta'a. The villages are divided between Tulkarm and Jenin, and many of them are in area A. There are about three refugee camps in the sector (Fahma, Nur Shams and the Jenin refugee camp), and the town of Qabatiya.

There are also a number of settlements in the sector, including Mevo Dotan, Avnei Hefetz, and the group of settlements that includes Shaked, Rihan, Hinanit and Tel Menashe. As a result of the 2005 disengagement, about three settlements in the sector of the brigade were evacuated - Ganim, Kadim and Sa-Nur.

Commanders of the brigade

References 

1987 establishments in Israel
Brigades of Israel
Military units and formations established in 1987